Polydesmida (from the Greek poly "many" and desmos "bond") is the largest order of millipedes, containing approximately 3,500 species, including all the millipedes reported to produce hydrogen cyanide (HCN). Polydesmids grow and develop through a series of moults, adding segments until they reach a fixed number in the adult stage, which is usually the same for a given sex in a given species, at which point the moulting and the addition of segments and legs stop. This mode of development, known as teloanamorphosis, distinguishes this order from most other orders of millipedes, which usually continue to moult as adults, developing through either euanamorphosis or hemianamorphosis.

Description
Members of the order Polydesmida are also known as flat-backed millipedes, because on most species, each body segment has wide lateral keels known as paranota. These keels are produced by the posterior half (metazonite) of each body ring behind the collum. Many of the larger species show bright coloration patterns which warn predators of their toxic secretions.

Adults usually have 20 segments, counting the collum as the first ring and the telson as the last ring. Juveniles have from 7 to 19 rings. In species with the usual 20 segments, adult females have 31 pairs of legs, but in adult males, the eighth leg pair (the first leg pair of the 7th ring) is modified into a single pair of gonopods, leaving only 30 pairs of walking legs.

Variation 
Many species deviate from the typical body plan. One striking and unique deviation occurs in adult males of the species Aenigmopus alatus, which retain 31 pairs of walking legs and feature no gonopods. This millipede is the only species in the infraclass Helminthomorpha without gonopods.

The most common deviation, however, is a reduction in the number of segments. Many species have only 19 segments (including the telson) as adults, including those in the genera Brachydesmus, Macrosternodesmus, Poratia, and Bacillidesmus. In these species, adult females have only 29 pairs of legs, and adult males have only 28 pairs of walking legs. In a few species, including Hexadesmus lateridens, Agenodesmus reticulatus, and Eutynellus flavior, adults have only 18 segments (including the telson), with a corresponding reduction in the number of leg pairs (27 in the adult female, 26 in the adult male, excluding the gonopods). Still other species exhibit sexual dimorphism in segment number, for example, Prosopodesmus panporus (the usual 20 in adult females, but only 19 in adult males) and Doratodesmus pholeter (19 in adult females; 18 in adult males), with the expected number of leg pairs given the number of segments in each sex. Even more unusual are two species, Ammodesmus congoensis and A. granum, in which adults in each sex can have 18 or 19 segments.

A few species deviate by having more than the usual number of segments, including those in the cave-dwelling genus Devillea. For example, in the species D. tuberculata, adult females have 22 segments and adult males have 21 (including the telson), with a corresponding increase in the number of leg pairs (35 in adult females and 32 in adult males, excluding the gonopods). Some species in this genus also exhibit variation in segment number within the same sex, for example, in D. subterranea, adult males can have as few as 19 segments or as many as 23 (including the telson). The most extreme outlier in segment number among polydesmids, however, is a cave-dwelling species discovered in Brazil, Dobrodesmus mirabilis, with adult males found to have 40 segments (including the telson).

Ecology
Polydesmids are very common in leaf litter, where they burrow by levering with the anterior end of the body. Some are preyed on by funnel-web spiders.

Classification 
The c. 3500 species of Polydesmida are variously classified into four suborders (names ending in "-idea"), and 29 families, the largest (numerically) including Paradoxosomatidae, Xystodesmidae, and Chelodesmidae.

Dalodesmidea Hoffman, 1980. 2 families
Dalodesmidae Cook, 1896
Vaalogonopodidae Verhoeff, 1940
Leptodesmidea Brölemann, 1916. 13 families
Chelodesmoidea Cook, 1895
Chelodesmidae Cook, 1895
Platyrhacoidea Pocock, 1895
Aphelidesmidae Brölemann, 1916
Platyrhacidae Pocock, 1895
Rhachodesmoidea Carl, 1903
Rhachodesmidae Carl, 1903
Tridontomidae Loomis & Hoffman, 1962
Sphaeriodesmoidea Humbert & de Saussure, 1869
Campodesmidae Cook, 1896
Holistophallidae Silvestri, 1909
Sphaeriodesmidae Humbert & de Saussure, 1869
Xystodesmoidea Cook, 1895
Eurymerodesmidae Causey, 1951
Euryuridae Pocock, 1909
Gomphodesmidae Cook, 1896
Oxydesmidae Cook, 1895
Xystodesmidae Cook, 1895
Paradoxosomatidea Daday, 1889. 1 family
Paradoxosomatidae Daday, 1889
Polydesmidea Pocock, 1887. 12 families
Oniscodesmoidea Simonsen, 1990
Dorsoporidae Loomis, 1958
Oniscodesmidae DeSaussure, 1860
Pyrgodesmoidea Silvestri, 1896
Ammodesmidae Cook, 1896
Cyrtodesmidae Cook, 1896
Pyrgodesmidae Silvestri, 1896
Haplodesmoidea Cook, 1895
Haplodesmidae Cook, 1895
Opisotretoidea Hoffman, 1980
Opisotretidae Hoffman, 1980
Polydesmoidea Leach, 1815
Cryptodesmidae Karsch, 1880
Polydesmidae Leach, 1815
Trichopolydesmoidea Verhoeff, 1910
Fuhrmannodesmidae Brölemann, 1916
Macrosternodesmidae Brölemann, 1916
Nearctodesmidae Chamberlin & Hoffman, 1958
Trichopolydesmidae Verhoeff, 1910

References

External links

External Anatomy of Polydesmida
North American Polydesmida - BugGuide

 
Millipede orders